Meiji Dam is a concrete dam near Ibara, Okayama Prefecture, Japan, completed in 1993. It was built for irrigation purposes.

References 

Dams in Okayama Prefecture
Dams completed in 1993